Eilema khasiana is a moth of the subfamily Arctiinae first described by Walter Rothschild in 1912. It is found in the Khasi Hills of India.

References

Moths described in 1912
khasiana